Interventional Neuroradiology is a bimonthly peer-reviewed medical journal covering neuroradiology. It was established in 1995 and is published by SAGE Publications. The editor-in-chief is Waleed Brinjikji (Mayo Clinic). According to the Journal Citation Reports, the journal has a 2021 impact factor of 1.760.

References

External links 
 

Radiology and medical imaging journals
Publications established in 1995
Bimonthly journals
SAGE Publishing academic journals
Neurology journals
Neuroradiology
English-language journals